James G. Boswell II (March 10, 1923 – April 3, 2009) was the head of J. G. Boswell Company, a company that Boswell built from a large family-held cotton farm into an agribusiness giant.

After a stint in the Navy during World War II, Boswell attended Stanford University, earning a degree in economics. During his career he sat on various corporate boards, including that of General Electric.  

Boswell inherited the J. G. Boswell Co. from his uncle James Griffin Boswell. In addition to increasing the size, Boswell focused on developing more productive cultivars and other technological advances to increase output and efficiency. Among his innovations was using lasers to level fields.

Boswell used the company's influence to successfully lobby for advantageous land and water policies in the state, including the construction of the Pine Flat Dam on the border of Kings Canyon National Park. The dam stemmed water flow to Tulare Lake, the now dry bed of which is a central part of the company's land.

During record breaking 1969 rains, local residents clamored for floodwaters from Pine Flat Lake to be diverted to Buena Vista Lake.  Representation on the irrigation district board, however, was determined by the value of landowners' land and J. G. Boswell Company owned the majority of land in the district.  J. G. Boswell Co. voted to block the floodwater diversion so that its crops on the Buena Vista lakebed would not be destroyed.

Residents whose homes were destroyed by the flood sued.  Limiting suffrage to landowners violated the one man, one vote guarantee in the U.S. Constitution, they alleged, because the irrigation district can levy taxes, exercise eminent domain, and decide whose land gets flooded.  In 1973 a divided United States Supreme Court disagreed, finding that a private company can exercise control of the irrigation district because flood control is not an important government function.

References

Further reading

The King of California: J. G. Boswell and the Making of a Secret American Empire, Mark Arax and Rick Wartzman, 2003, PublicAffairs.   (pbk)

Farmers from California
Businesspeople from California
1923 births
2009 deaths

20th-century American businesspeople
United States Navy personnel of World War II